is a retired professional Japanese baseball player and manager.

Mori played Nippon Professional Baseball from 1955–1974 as the catcher of the Yomiuri Giants. He was an eight-time Best Nine Award-winner (1961–1968) and the Japan Series MVP in 1967. He was selected to eleven Nippon Professional Baseball All-Star Games.

After his retirement as a player, Mori managed the Seibu Lions from 1986–1994, leading the team to the Japan Series championship in 1986. He won the Matsutaro Shoriki Award in 1986 and 1990. Mori managed the Yokohama BayStars in 2001–2002.

External links

1937 births
Living people
People from Gifu
Japanese baseball players
Nippon Professional Baseball catchers
Yomiuri Giants players
Managers of baseball teams in Japan
Seibu Lions managers
Yokohama DeNA BayStars managers
Baseball people from Gifu Prefecture
Japanese Baseball Hall of Fame inductees